Dmitry Bukhman (born 27 May 1985) is a Russian-born Israeli entrepreneur. Together with his brother Igor Bukhman, they founded online gaming company Playrix, which is best known for its mobile-app games such as Homescapes and Fishdom.

Dmitry and his brother Igor were born in the Soviet city of Vologda (in what is now Russia). As a child, Dmitry was engaged in programming. Together with his brother, he started selling games online while still in high school. By 2004, the brothers had released three games and around 30 screensavers; by 2007, the number of games increased to 16, and the monthly income of the company constituted around $300,000. Soon the company released such games as Homescapes, Gardenscapes, Fishdom and Township. In 2014, Dmitry Bukhman moved to Dublin. In 2016, he acquired Israeli citizenship.

In 2018, the brothers personally invested in video and social network games developer Nexters Global and in Belarusian Vizor Games. In 2019, Playrix bought the Armenian and Serbian studios Plexonic and Eipix Entertainment, respectively.

Dmitry Bukhman made the 2022 Forbes Billionaires List with an estimated wealth of $8.1 billion and occupied the 275th position.

References 

1985 births
21st-century Israeli businesspeople
21st-century Russian businesspeople
Israeli billionaires
Israeli businesspeople
Israeli computer programmers
Living people
People from Vologda
Russian billionaires
Russian computer programmers
Russian emigrants to Israel
Russian businesspeople in Israel
Russian activists against the 2022 Russian invasion of Ukraine